Thomas-Bernd Quaas is a German businessman. He served as the chief executive officer of Beiersdorf between 2005 and 2012.

Biography
Thomas-Bernd Quaas was born in 1952 in Glauchau.

He serves on the supervisory boards of Euler Hermes and Tesa.

References

Living people
1952 births
People from Glauchau
Businesspeople from Saxony
Beiersdorf people